A side-altar or bye-altar is an altar that is subordinate to the central or high altar in a church. The term is generally applied to altars that are situated in the bay or bays of the nave, transepts, etc.  Side-altars may be recessed in a side-chapel, or against a main aisle wall.

References

See also
Lady chapel

Church architecture